Riby Street Platform was a railway station which served the Riby Street area of Grimsby from 1904 to 1941. It was opened by the Great Central Railway to serve the first dock in Grimsby but was closed during World War II and never reopened. A source with local knowledge refers to the station as "Riby Street Platforms".

The station was known as "Skateknob Junction" by workers at the nearby fish docks. It consisted of two narrow wooden platforms connected by a footbridge. Although the platforms had been removed, the footbridge was still plain to see in 1961.

Services
The station was opened in 1904 aiming at services for workers at the adjacent docks, most of which were unadvertised. Public advertised service only 1917-1919 and accordingly it is not shown in the July 1922 Bradshaw.

Aftermath
By 2015 no trace of the station could be found. The line through the station site had been reduced to single track, but a regular passenger service to Cleethorpes. No railborne fish traffic had been carried from Grimsby for many years.

References

Sources

External links
 The station on a 25" OS map overlay National Library of Scotland
 The station on a 1908 OS map overlay National Library of Scotland
 Riby St Platform on an OS map surveyed in 1931 National Library of Scotland
 The station and its line railwaycodes

Disused railway stations in the Borough of North East Lincolnshire
Former Great Central Railway stations
Railway stations in Great Britain opened in 1904
Railway stations in Great Britain closed in 1941